Vidhi may refer to:

Given name 
Vidhi Pandya, an Indian actress
Vidhi Kasliwal, an Indian film director and producer
Vidhi Sindhwad, an Indian actress

Surname 
 Janet Vidhi, an Indian squash player

Entertainment 
 Vidhi (film), a 1984 film
 Vidhi (TV series), a 2017 TV series